Six or Aaaru is a 2012 Telugu-language mystery thriller film, created by Vega Entertainments Pvt Ltd. The film was produced by Bollamoni Krishna and directed by Srikanth Lingaad. It stars Jagapati Babu, Gayathri Iyer  and music composed by Ravi Varma. The film, which was also dubbed into Hindi, was a flop.

Plot
The film is set in Uravakonda in Nallamala forest where a series of mysterious deaths undertake in darkness. As it happens, An unknown creature is slaying people by sucking their blood. Hence, they do not exit their houses between 6 pm–6 am. Moreover, the police are also unable to sort out this strange phenomenon. All are under dichotomy whether is the action of wizards, ghosts, curses, etc. During that plight, a cop arrives in disguise and opens the closed book. It is indeed, foul play of Jagga Reddy a malefactor to conceal his criminal deeds. So, the cop surrounds to nab but he skips to the forest where shockingly, he is killed in the same pattern. Next, the cop is aware that, the one and only who is cognizant of fact is Tripura a well-educated native villager. After an interrogation, as a flabbergast, she avows it is an act of Vijay That has died six months ago but is still alive and moves rearward. Vijay the fiancé of Tripura is a meritorious student who triumphs top in IAS. One day, he clinically dies due to a thunderbolt. A bird of passage scientist who researches giving rebirth to a succumbed human utilizes Vijay as his tool. He digs out his body and starts his experiment. However, it flounders and Vijay falls victim as a virus is injected turning him into a monastery that works 6 PM To 6 AM. Now the scientist invites the anti-dose, and with the aid of Cop & Tripura set out in quest of Vijay. They desperately, efforts and reaches mid of forest. By that time, the clock sounds 6 pm and bloodthirsty Vijay freaks out on them. At last, Tripura struggles hard to succeed in retrieving Vijay to a regular state with anti-virus. Finally, the movie ends on a happy note with the village running 24 hours a day, and Vijay landing as an IAS officer.

Cast
Jagapati Babu as Vijay
Gayathri Iyer as Tripura
Satyam Rajesh as Police Officer
Pruthvi Raj as Jagga Reddy
Surya as Scientist
Debina Bonnerjee in surru item song

Soundtrack

The soundtrack was composed by Ravi Varma and released on VEGA Music Company.

References

2012 films
2010s Telugu-language films
Indian mystery thriller films